Edgar Newcomb Wrightington (July 30, 1875 – October 31, 1945) was an American college football player and coach. He attended Harvard University, where he played as a halfback for the Harvard Crimson and was selected to the 1896 College Football All-America Team. He served as Harvard's head football coach in 1904. Wrightington later became a successful banker and oil and gas company executive. He served in various executive positions with Boston Consolidated Gas Cos., the New England Fuel and Transportation Co., and Beacon Oil Co.

Biography
Wrightington was born on July 30, 1875 in Brookline, Massachusetts to Charles W. Wrightington and Catherine G. Schermerhorn. He died in Salem, Massachusetts in 1945 at age 70.

Head coaching record

References

1875 births
1945 deaths
19th-century players of American football
American football halfbacks
Harvard Crimson football coaches
Harvard Crimson football players
All-American college football players
Players of American football from Massachusetts